Taufik Soleh (born November 25, 1985) is an Indonesian footballer who currently plays for Persiwa Wamena in the Indonesia Super League.

Club career statistics

Honours

Club honors
Mojokerto Putra
First Division (1): 2008–09

References

External links

1985 births
Association football midfielders
Living people
Indonesian footballers
Liga 1 (Indonesia) players
Persiwa Wamena players
Indonesian Premier Division players
Persebaya Surabaya players
PS Mojokerto Putra players